5X5 Live is the fourth (double) live album by Scottish rock band Simple Minds, released on 19 November 2012.

Overview

The album is composed of recordings from Simple Minds' "5X5 Live" tour to promote the similarly-named box set. It features five songs from each of the band's first five albums, as well as five bonus tracks.

Sound engineer Olivier Gerard mixed the tracks at Jet Studio, Brussels. The intro "Reel" was mixed by guitarist Charlie Burchilll and consisted of brief snippets of songs from the era, edited together eventually leading into "I Travel" as the band took to the stage. This short piece of music was made available to download for free from the simpleminds.com members section prior to the album's release.

Release
5X5 Live was released in a clamshell box consisting of two CDs, each in card packaging and which reflected artwork similar to that of the 1981 album set Sons and Fascination/Sister Feelings Call. It also features a colour booklet of live and studio images, credits, quotes from the band, a fold out tour poster and a peel-off sticker in the style of a concert ticket.

The album was the middle set of three multi CD reissues/compilations (each incorporating similar styled packaging) that had begun with the 5X5 Box Set itself and ended with the 2013 releases of 6 live shows (6 digipacks / 12 CDs) entitled Celebrate - The Greatest Hits+ Tour 2013.

Recording
The album was recorded at the following locations and venues:
Razzamatazz, Barcelona, Spain, 16 February 2012,
Cirque Royal, Brussels, Belgium, 23 February 2012,
the O2 Academy, Birmingham, England, 24 February 2012,
Barrowland Ballroom, Glasgow, Scotland, 25 February 2012,
The Roundhouse, London, England, 2 March 2012,
Théâtre Antique d'Arles, Arles, France, 21 July 2012,
Pinede Gould, Antibes Juan-Les-Pins, France, 25 July 2012 and
Villa Bellini, Catania, Sicily 31 July 2012.

Track list

References

External links

2012 live albums
Simple Minds live albums